Roisin Alice Gallagher (born March 1987) is a Northern Irish actress and playwright. She began her career in theatre. On television, she is known for her roles in the BritBox series The Dry (2022) and the Sky Atlantic series The Lovers (2023).

Early life
Gallagher is from Andersonstown, a suburb of West Belfast, and was born to father Daniel (d. 2017) from Tyrone and mother Pat. She has three older sisters and a younger brother. She attended St Genevieve's High School. She graduated with a Bachelor of Arts in Acting from the Royal Scottish Academy of Music and Drama (now the Royal Conservatoire of Scotland).

Career
Gallagher made her television debut as Alicia Hodge in two 2009 episodes of the BBC One medical soap opera Doctors. Her early stage work includes The Bloody Chamber and The Wicked Lady in England, and Be My Baby and Sleep Eat Party in Belfast. She starred as the titular character in The Haunting of Helena Blunden at the Waterfront Hall. This was followed by Dockers and White Star of the North at the Lyric Theatre, Belfast. She would return to the Lyric for Weddins, Weeins and Wakes, Demented, Pentecost, Stitched Up, Little Red Riding Hood, Love or Money, Smiley, and Bah, Humbug!.

In 2012, Gallagher played Helena in A Midsummer Night's Dream at the Royal Lyceum Theatre in Edinburgh. The following year, she made her feature film debut in actor Paul Kennedy's 2013 directorial debut Made in Belfast. She played DC Emer Taylor in the BBC Two crime drama The Fall. At the Belfast Festival at Queen's, she appeared in Belfast by Moonlight and debuted the play The Holy Holy Bus, which she would return to. Her other stage work includes Playhouse Creatures in Lisburn.

Gallagher wrote her first play Natural Disaster to process her grief over losing her father in 2017. After starring in Abigail's Party at the MAC, Gallagher premiered her play there. She also returned to A Midsummer Night's Dream, this time playing Hermia at Queen's Hall in Newtownards, went on tour with Is That Too Hot?, and appeared in The Real Housewives of Norn Iron at the Grand Opera House. The following year, Gallagher returned to film in Nowhere Special.

In 2021, it was announced Gallagher would star in her first lead television role as Shiv Sheridan in the BritBox and RTÉ comedy-drama The Dry, which premiered in 2022. She also appeared in the horror film Mandrake and the television film St Mungo's. She has an upcoming role opposite Johnny Flynn in the Sky Atlantic series The Lovers.

Personal life
Gallagher is married to Craig Hutchison, a Scottish electrician from Penicuik. The couple met while Gallagher was in Edinburgh for A Midsummer Night's Dream. They have two sons.

Filmography

Film

Television

Stage

References

External links
 
 Roisin Gallagher at Spotlight

Living people
1987 births
21st-century actresses from Northern Ireland
Actresses from Belfast
Alumni of the Royal Conservatoire of Scotland